SS Carondelet was an immigrant ship, active in 1877 and 1878, that transported immigrants from Havana to New York City. It weighed 15118.29 tons.

External links

Victorian-era passenger ships